Allston is an English language surname. Notable people with the surname include:

 Aaron Allston (1960–2014), American game designer and writer
 Johanna Allston (born 1986), Australian orienteer
 Robert Francis Withers Allston (1801–1864), Governor of South Carolina
 Washington Allston (1779–1843), American poet and influential painter
 Charles Allston Collins (1828–1873), British painter and writer

See also 
 Alston (name)

References